"Rock and Roll" is a song by English rock band Led Zeppelin, which was first released as the second track from the band's fourth album in 1971. The song includes a guest appearance by the Rolling Stones pianist Ian Stewart. In 1972 Robert Christgau called it "simply the most dynamic hard-rock song in the music."

Recording
According to guitarist Jimmy Page, "Rock and Roll" developed from a spontaneous jam session, while the band were trying to finish recording "Four Sticks", at the Headley Grange mansion they had rented in Hampshire, England. John Bonham began by playing the drum introduction from the Little Richard song "Keep A-Knockin'" to which Page added a Chuck Berry-style guitar riff.  The tapes were rolling and fifteen minutes later the basis of the song was completed. The song is performed in the key of A at a relatively fast tempo of 170 beats per minute.

Reception
Cash Box described it as a "rip-apart performance of one of best r&r revivalist tunes ever." In 2019, Rolling Stone ranked the song number 9 on its list of the 40 greatest Led Zeppelin songs.

Live performances
"Rock and Roll" was a key component of the band's setlist at Led Zeppelin concerts from 1971 on. Initially, Plant referred to it on stage as "It's Been A Long Time", which is the first line of the song. In 1972 it was elevated to the opening number of all concert performances and it retained this status until 1975. For the band's 1977 North American tour, it became part of a medley encore with "Whole Lotta Love", and during 1979 and 1980 it became an encore in its own right.

Cadillac advertising
In 2001, "Rock and Roll" became the first Led Zeppelin song to be licensed for commercial use, when American car maker Cadillac featured it in television advertising. Plant commented:

As well as earning Led Zeppelin a large licensing fee, the advertising campaign increased Cadillac sales by 16 percent in 2002.

Charts

Certifications

Accolades

See also
List of cover versions of Led Zeppelin songs – "Rock and Roll" entries

References

External links
"Rock and Roll" live in New York 1973 at Ledzeppelin.com

Songs about rock music
1971 songs
1972 singles
Atlantic Records singles
Led Zeppelin songs
British rock-and-roll songs
Song recordings produced by Jimmy Page
Songs written by Jimmy Page
Songs written by Robert Plant
Songs written by John Paul Jones (musician)
Songs written by John Bonham